Kyung-chul, also spelled Kyong-chol or Gyeong-cheol, is a Korean masculine given name. Its meaning differs based on the hanja used to write each syllable of the name. There are 54 hanja with the reading "kyung" and 11 hanja with the reading "chul" on the South Korean government's official list of hanja which may be registered for use in given names.

People with this name include:
Cho Gyeong-chul (1929–2010), South Korean astronomer
Park Gyeong-cheol (born 1969), South Korean sprint canoer
Ri Kyong-chol (born 1979), North Korean long-distance runner
Lee Kyung-chul, South Korean archer
Cho Kyong-chol, North Korean Supreme People's Assembly member for Sungrisan; see 2014 North Korean parliamentary election

Fictional characters with this name include:
 Jang Kyung-chul, in 2010 South Korean film I Saw the Devil

See also
List of Korean given names

References

Korean masculine given names